Paratoxodera borneana, common name Borneo stick mantis, is a species of praying mantis found in Brunei that was originally identified as a subspecies of P. cornicollis. In 2009 when the tribe Toxoderini was revised, borneana was classified as a morph due to the lack of major characteristics that distinguish it from cornicollis besides for the absence of a second lobe of the pronotum.

References

Mantidae
Insects described in 1931